Isaac Bear Early College High School, also called Isaac Bear, is a selective-enrollment school at 630 MacMillan Avenue, Wilmington, North Carolina. The premises are situated on UNCW campus and were founded in the auditorium of Annie H. Snipes Elementary school in the year 2006. New Hanover County Schools operates this school with the support of the University of North Carolina at Wilmington and the Gates Foundation. Students must apply to attend this school; no more than 100 submissions are accepted per year. As of the 2008–2009 school year, only 62–63 students were accepted. The program allows for students to work and earn up to 60 college credits, which, on average, are worth about $15,210. "As a partner in the North Carolina University System and the North Carolina New Schools Project, Isaac Bear Early College High School provides an accelerated, college-ready education by cultivating an environment of mature scholarship and leadership."

Background and Original Building 
The original Isaac Bear Building, located at Market and 13th Streets, served as the first home of Wilmington College, outside the public school system. Classes were first held there in 1947. Constructed in 1912, the name of the first building was given by Samuel Bear, Jr. (1854–1916) as a memorial to his brother, Isaac Bear. The Bear family, owners of an intrastate wholesale dry goods firm located on Front Street, made a number of large donations to better the community such as a wing to James Walker Memorial Hospital. Isaac Bear was known as "one of Wilmington's most capable and highly esteemed businessmen." He was a member of North State Lodge of B'nai B'rith, past Grand President of District Grand Lodge, and B.P.O.E Elks #532. Upon his death, the Isaac Bear Memorial School served to remember "the close friendship and devotion between the brothers and their interest in public welfare." The school and its name stands as a memorial to Samuel Bear Jr.'s original intentions—to honor his late brother Isaac.

The Early College Program
Early College High Schools are small, autonomous schools where students complete all high school requirements and up to 60 hours of college credit during their four years of high school. Early College High Schools make higher education more accessible, affordable, and attractive by bridging the divide between high school and college; eliminate time wasted during the junior and senior years of high school and facilitate the transition of motivated students to higher education; provide intensive guidance and support from adults through the start of college coursework; and demonstrate new ways of integrating levels of schooling to better serve the intellectual and developmental needs of young people.

The Gates Foundation Contributions
In 2002, the Early College High School Initiative launched, funded by the Bill and Melinda Gates Foundation. Contributions from this organization, (totaling in over $124 million, as of 2008), assisted in the founding of over 230 early colleges across 28 of the 50 United States, 10 of these existing in North Carolina. It is because of these contributions that Isaac Bear and other like Early College programs have been able to sustain themselves.

Notable alumni
George Pocheptsov, painter, philanthropist, and former child prodigy

References

Wilmington Star, Published July 12. 2006 3:30AM: Program helps high schoolers get a jump on college studies. By Sam Scott

External links
Official website

Bear, Isaac
Schools in Wilmington, North Carolina